USS Percival may refer to the following ships of the United States Navy:

, was a  commissioned in 1920 and decommissioned in 1930
Percival (DD-452) was planned as an experimental destroyer, but the contract was canceled in January 1946. The machinery was used in 

United States Navy ship names